Chester Village Cemetery is a historic cemetery at the junction of New Hampshire Routes 102 and 121 in the center of Chester, New Hampshire.  Established in 1751, it is one of the state's older cemeteries, and is particularly unusual for the large number of grave markers that were signed by their carvers.  It was added to the National Register of Historic Places in 1979.

Description and history
The Chester Village Cemetery is located in the town center of Chester, at the eastern corner of Routes 102 and 121. Monuments in this older section are predominantly of either slate or sandstone, although there are some that are marble.

The cemetery was established in 1751, and became the town's main burying ground.  Prior to that time, many families had buried their dead either in small family plots or in church yards; after this cemetery was established, many moved their dead here.  The cemetery has one of the largest number of signed gravestones in the region.  Two prominent local stone carvers were Stephen and Abel Webster, both of whose works appear here (Abel Webster is also buried here).  This has enabled researchers to differentiate their styles from each other, making possible the identification of their work in other regional cemeteries.

Prominent burials include two Governors of New Hampshire, Samuel and John Bell, and William Richardson, Chief Justice of the New Hampshire Supreme Court.

See also
National Register of Historic Places listings in Rockingham County, New Hampshire
New Hampshire Historical Marker No. 139: Chester Village Cemetery

References

Cemeteries on the National Register of Historic Places in New Hampshire
Buildings and structures in Rockingham County, New Hampshire
National Register of Historic Places in Rockingham County, New Hampshire
Chester, New Hampshire
Cemeteries established in the 18th century
1751 establishments in New Hampshire